The International Girls in ICT Day is celebrated on the fourth Thursday in April to create awareness on the need for more girls and women in the information and communications technology (ICT) sector.

Background 
The day is an initiative of the Plenipotentiary Resolution 70 (Rev. Busan, 2014) by the Member States of the International Telecommunication Union to create programs that encourage girls and young women to consider studies and careers in information and communication technologies.

In 2022, the African Development Bank's Coding for Employment program set aside half its training slots for women applicants to commemorate International Girls in ICT Day.

Participation 
In 2015, annual Girls in ICT Day events recorded about 177,000 girls around the world through over 5,300 events in more than 150 countries. By 2022, International Telecommunication Union data showed that more than 3,62,000 girls and young women have celebrated more than 11,000 celebrations in 171 countries worldwide during the International Girls in ICT Day.

References

See also  
International Day of the Girl Child

International Telecommunication Union
Civil awareness days
Feminist events
Recurring events established in 2014
April observances
Women in technology